The competitive standard of rugby within the fourth Division began to show itself during this season. Four wins in the first twelve games up to Christmas, followed by three wins in the next nine up to the end of March, left the ‘Fera in a precarious position. Difficulties were reflected in the Cup tournaments, early first round exits being the form. Nevertheless typically and with ‘dogged’ resistance and determination, the side earned three consecutive league victories astride an Easter tour win at Wakefield. 121 points were scored in these vital games, including 18 tries, and three sin bins in the process reflected the intensity and effort.

The first match was the most notable being a 48-17 away ‘smothering’ of long time adversaries Tumble – scrum half Phillip Thomas scored two tries, centre Simon Donovan two tries, a try for prop Andrew Key, a try for flanker Stephen Munkley, a try and sin bin for hooker Arwel Williams and a drop goal with five conversions for outside half Damian James. This result was followed seven days later with a 22-6 home win over Mumbles, Donovan scored another two tries, a try for winger Ashley Carter, a try and conversion for D. James and another sin bin  for Williams. The 17-10 home win over Kenfig Hill saw another try for Donovan, a try for Andrew Key, a conversion and drop goal for D. James and a conversion by Martyn Stoneman. This result guaranteed Division Four rugby for Ystalyfera next year. D. James scored 127 points this season, Donovan 8 tries. 

Captain for the fourth time was Kevin Williams. Neil Lynch was voted Players Player of the year and Ashley Carter voted favourite amongst the supporters for the second year running.

National League Division 4 West

Ystalyfera 2002/03 Season Results

Ystalyfera 2002/03 Season Player Stats

References

Sport in Neath Port Talbot